Steven R. Matteson (born 1965, Chicago, Illinois) is an American typeface designer whose work is included in several computer operating systems and embedded in game consoles, cell phones and other electronic devices. He is the designer of the Microsoft font family Segoe included since Windows XP; of the Droid font collection used in the Android mobile device platform, and designed the brand and user-interface fonts used in both the original Microsoft Xbox and the Xbox 360.

Biography
Matteson is a 1988 graduate of Rochester Institute of Technology where he studied typography, design and printing. Upon graduation, he spent two years learning font hinting technology while employed at laser-printer manufacturer QMS.

In 1990 Matteson began work at Monotype Corporation (later Agfa-Monotype) contributing to the creation of the Windows 3.1x core TrueType fonts: Arial, Times New Roman and Courier New.

Matteson produced fonts for the Agfa-Monotype library (such as Goudy Ornate and Gill Floriated Capitals) and directed custom-font design for companies including Agilent Technologies, Symantec and Microsoft. Matteson designed Andalé Mono as a mono-spaced command line and coding font for Taligent. The font is now bundled with Mac OS X and was one of the original Core fonts for the Web.

Matteson directed custom-type development for Agfa-Monotype until 2003. In 2004 he became a founding partner and Director of Type Design at Ascender Corporation in Elk Grove Village, Illinois.

In 2005, Matteson designed the font family Convection for use in the branding and user-interface of Microsoft’s Xbox 360 game console. Matteson also designed the user-interface font used in Microsoft’s Zune music player. In 2007 software maker Red Hat released the open-source Liberation fonts family designed by Matteson. Also in 2007, Matteson designed the Droid family of fonts included in the Android mobile-phone platform supported by the Open Handset Alliance.

Fonts designed by Steve Matteson

Andalé Mono
Andalé Sans
Andy Bold
Arimo
Ascender Sans
Ascender Sans Bold
Ascender Serif
Ascender Serif Bold
Ayita
Ayita Bold
Bierstadt
Binner Gothic
Blueprint
Cambria
Cambria Bold
Chicory
Convection
Cousine
Curlz
Dujour
Droid
Endurance Pro
Endurance Pro Black
Endurance Pro Light
Facade Condensed
Fineprint
Fineprint Swash One
Fineprint Swash Two
Futura Now
Goudy Ornate
Kootenay Pro
Liberation Mono
Liberation Sans
Liberation Serif
Lindsey Pro
Massif Pro
Mayberry
Miramonte Pro
Miramonte Pro Bold
Noto Sans for Latin
Open Sans
Open Sans Condensed
Open Serif
Othello
Pescadero Pro
Pescadero Pro Bold
Segoe
Sports Three
Sports Two
Tinos
Titanium
Truesdell
Truesdell Ornaments
Twentieth Century Poster Fonts

References

1965 births
Rochester Institute of Technology alumni
American typographers and type designers
Living people